A handrail is a rail that is designed to be grasped by the hand so as to provide safety or support. In Britain, handrails are referred to as banisters. Handrails are usually used to provide support for body or to hold clothings in a bathroom or similar areas. Handrails are commonly used while ascending or descending stairways and escalators in order to prevent injurious falls or to hold necessities. Handrails are typically supported by balusters or attached to walls. 

Similar items not covered in this article include bathroom handrails—which help to prevent falls on slippery, wet floors—other grab bars, used, for instance, in ships' galleys, and barres, which serve as training aids for ballet dancers. Guard rails and balustrades line drop-offs and other dangerous areas, keeping people and vehicles out.

British specifications 
British Standard and British Standard Code of Practice are harmonized to European Normal (EN) series.

US specifications

Dimensions 
Various model codes—The International Code Council (ICC) and National Fire Protection Association (NFPA)—and accessibility standards—ANSI A117.1 and the Americans With Disabilities Act Standards for Accessible Design (ADASAD)—refer to handrail dimensions. Current versions of these codes and standards now agree that handrail is defined as either a circular cross section with an outside diameter of  minimum and  maximum or a non-circular cross section with a perimeter dimension of  minimum and  maximum and a cross section dimension of ) maximum.

The IRC and residential portion of the 2009 IBC define Type II handrail as follows:

Type II. Handrails with a perimeter greater than  shall provide a graspable finger recess area on both sides of the profile.

In areas where children are the principal users of a building or facility, the 2010 ADASAD recommends that a second set of handrails at a maximum height of  measured to the top of the gripping surface from the ramp surface or stair nosing can assist in preventing accidents.

Clearance 

The distance between the wall and handrail gripping surface is also governed by local code with the most common requirement being  minimum.

This was actually a "grab bar" dimension which was part of the 1986 ANSI A117.1. ANSI changed the notation to  minimum in 1990. This was not corrected in 2010 with the approval of the new ADASAD which now calls for a  minimum clearance.

Codes also generally require that there be a  clearance between the underside of the handrail and any obstruction—including the horizontal bracket arm.

Strength 
As handrails come in different materials, the strengths can vary. From timber to stainless steel, it is best to pick a handrail that will be right for the area. Stainless steel will be stronger and more durable outside, whereas timber can be just as strong but less durable outside.

ADA height notations 

ADA Handrail height requirements are issued to create a safe enjoyable space to enjoy for everyone. The ADA height of handrail requirements that will primarily be used by children have their own unique requirements.   

The top of gripping surfaces of handrails shall be 34 inches minimum and 38 inches  maximum vertically above walking surfaces, stair nosing, and ramp surfaces. Handrails shall be at a consistent height above walking surfaces, stair nosing, and ramp surfaces.

When children are the principal users in a building or facility (e.g., elementary schools), a second set of handrails at an appropriate height can assist them and aid in preventing accidents. A maximum height of 28 inches measured to the top of the gripping surface from the ramp surface or stair nosing.  Sufficient vertical clearance between upper and lower handrails, 9 inches minimum, should be provided to help prevent entrapment.

Adult requirements 

Top of gripping surfaces of handrails shall be between  vertically above walking surfaces, stair nosings, and ramp surfaces.  Handrails shall be at a consistent height above walking surfaces, stair nosings, and ramp surfaces.

Child recommendation 

When children are the principal users in a building or facility (e.g., elementary schools), a second set of handrails at an appropriate height can assist them and aid in preventing accidents.  A maximum height of  measured to the top of the gripping surface from the ramp surface or stair nosing is recommended for handrails designed for children. Sufficient vertical clearance between upper and lower handrails,  minimum, should be provided to help prevent entrapment.

Types of handrails

Handrails are available in several different varieties including wooden/timber, stainless steel or aluminium. Some varieties are more hard wearing than others, and the cost can vary depending on the style you choose. You can also choose various fixings to allow for a more modern/sleek look.

See also 
 Guard rail
 Hanging strap
 Mobile safety steps

References

External links

Stairs
Stairways
Architectural elements
Garden features
Ironmongery